Marina Salamon (born 3 September 1958) is an Italian entrepreneur.

Biography
At only seventeen years, Salamon became the partner of the entrepreneur Luciano Benetton and the two remained together until 1993. Towards the end of their relationship their son Brando was born, who is officially recognized by his father, but who grows up with his mother and with her new partner Marco Benatti, an advertising manager that Salamon married in 1998 with whom she has three children; for a few years she also has two teenage girls in temporary foster care.

She has a degree in history at Ca' Foscari University of Venice.

At twenty-three, thanks to the financial support of Luciano Benetton, Salamon establishes the company Altana, specializing in the production of garments. As president and majority shareholder of the company, she grows Altana by taking over other companies, to make it known at European level. The company takes over the management of various brands, including Moschino, Liu Jo, Jeckerson and, for several years, Moncler.

As proprietor and sole administrator of the Alchimia holding company, in 1992 Salamon acquired from the heirs of the founder Pierpaolo Luzzatto Fegiz the control of the Doxa (company of which for many years the president and managing director was her father Ennio Salamon), coming to hold the 90% of the shares. In 2006, she assumes the role of managing director of Doxa and in 2012 also that of president, after having dismissed her father Ennio. In 2006, together with Emma Marcegaglia, she founded the company Arendi, which deals with producing photovoltaic plants; the company then closed.

Salamon also have had experiences in politics. Always close to the positions of Communion and Liberation, she has moved several times between center-right and center-left. In 1994 she was a candidate on the  Democratic Alliance list, which he then left; in the same year he joined the council of comune of Venice as a spokesman for the mayor Massimo Cacciari, but she was removed her from office after a few months. Later she was a promoter of the Fare di Oscar Giannino. Salamon has been for over ten years the international councilor of the WWF with delegation for the management of assets, personnel, finance, and for budgeting.

In 2013, her book Dai vita ai tuoi sogni, was published by Mondadori.

For her work as an entrepreneur and manager, Salamon received the Premio Marisa Bellisario in 1992.

References 

1958 births
Living people
20th-century Italian businesswomen
20th-century Italian businesspeople
21st-century Italian businesswomen
21st-century Italian businesspeople
Italian corporate directors